Verkhny Sardyk (Ürge Särźek) is a rural locality (a selo) in Tatar-Ulkanovsky Selsoviet, Tuymazinsky District, Bashkortostan, Russia. The population was 406 as of 2010. There are 11 streets.

Geography 
Verkhny Sardyk is located 26 km northeast of Tuymazy (the district's administrative centre) by road. Nizhny Sardyk is the nearest rural locality.

References 

Rural localities in Tuymazinsky District